Gaviota is the Spanish word for "seagull". It may refer to:

Places 
 Gaviota, California, an unincorporated area on the Gaviota Coast, California
 Gaviota Coast, undeveloped area in Santa Barbara County, California
 Gaviota Peak, a summit in the Santa Ynez Mountains, California
 Gaviota State Park in southern Santa Barbara County, California
 Gaviota Tunnel, a tunnel on U.S. Route 101 and California State Route 1 completed in 1953 in the Gaviota Pass
 Isla de las Gaviotas, Montevideo, an islet in Montevideo, Uruguay

Other 
 Gaviota (award), the most important prize awarded by the public in the Viña del Mar International Song Festival
 Gaviota (genus), an extinct Laridae genus
 Gaviota traidora, a 1969 corrido by Margarito Estrada